Ian Yule (1933 — 3 December 2020) was a British born South African actor and soldier. He had a film career that commenced in the late 1960s and lasted to around the early to mid 2000s. Many of the roles he has played are that of a soldier. The films he has appeared in include Killer Force, in 1976, One Way also released in 1976, Golden Rendezvous in 1977,  The Wild Geese in 1978,  —Safari 3000 in 1982, City of Blood in 1983, and many more. He was also a stuntman in a few films. He also was a screenwriter and wrote some screen plays including Shamwari in which he starred opposite Ken Gampu. He was a well known actor in South Africa.

Background
Ian Yule was born in the UK some time before the second world war. During his career he was a member of the British Army's Royal Artillery, Parachute Regiment and Special Air Service and served in the Korean War, taking part in the Battle of Inchon and Battle of Chosin Reservoir, and later served in the Rhodesian Security Forces and South African Defence Force as well as serving as a mercenary in Mad Mike Hoare's outfit (the film the Wild Geese is based on Hoare's exploits). As an actor in the action genre he was recognised for his accomplishments.

Film career

1950s–1960s
Yule's first association with films goes back to the 1950s when he had a role as a stuntman in the 1959 film Ben-Hur. He also did stunt work in The Longest Day which was released in 1962. His early acting roles included playing the part of Andy Wilson in 1967 film Wild Season which was directed by Emil Nofal. In 1968, he had a recurring role as Freddy in the television series Schatzsucher unserer Tage which was directed by Rolf von Sydow.

1970s–1980s
He played the part of Trooper Dillon in the David Millin directed Shangani Patrol which was released in 1970. In the 1978 Wild Geese, playing the part of Sgt. Tosh Donaldson, he was part of a cast that included Richard Burton, Roger Moore and Richard Harris. 

Starring opposite Ken Gampu, he appeared in the 1982 film Shamwari. The film bore a similarity to an earlier film,  The Defiant Ones that starred Sidney Poitier and Tony Curtis. Like the characters in that film, there is racial hatred between the two of them. They escape from a chain gang detail. To survive they have to get rid of their hatred for each other. Yule was led to believe that the film was a flop, however John Hume who produced the film was marketing it under a different name and making money from it.

In 1986, he appeared as Bill Smith in the film Jake Speed. He played the part of Max Wharton in the 1988 film, City of Blood.

1990s–2000s
He played the part of Harvey in the 1995 film Cyborg Cop III which was directed by Yossi Wein. In the 1999 film Operation Delta Force 3: Clear Target, he played the part of General Hightower.

Later years
In mid-December 2015, Yule arrived at Heathrow Airport from South Africa, in poor health and destitute. He had a carry bag, his knobkerrie walking sticks and a couple of shirts and underwear. He was met and collected from the airport by a volunteer, who had been moved by his plight and subsequently cared for him for some two months.

After being helped by one organisation, the South African Legion, the SSAFA were instrumental in getting him the care he required for his heart problems and severe arthritis. He was later hospitalised at St Richard's Hospital in Chichester where he died on 3 December 2020.

Filmography

References

External links
 
 South African Legion: Ian Yule
 My own actors library: Ian Yule

British mercenaries
English mercenaries
British expatriates in South Africa
British male film actors
20th-century British male actors
21st-century British male actors
British male screenwriters
British stunt performers
2020 deaths
1933 births